The Cupboard Under the Stairs is a Miles Franklin Award-winning novel by Australian author George Turner.  This novel shared the award with The Well Dressed Explorer by Thea Astley.

The novel tells the story of Harry White, who attempts to rebuild his life after spending six years in a mental institution.

Notes
The novel carries the following dedication: "To Betty and Lindsay Bloomfield for one reason and another".

The author added the following note: "Kilkalla is not modelled on any existing branch of the Department of Mental Hygiene.  To eliminate such confusion I have employed only generalized statements as to the detailed nature of the work carried on there, emphasizing only that it is experimental."

1962 Australian novels
Miles Franklin Award-winning works
Novels by George Turner
Cassell (publisher) books
Novels about mental health